August Kerem (11 October 1889 – 28 May 1942 Sosva, Sverdlovsk Oblast, Russian SFSR) was an Estonian politician. He was a member of I Riigikogu.

Political offices:

 1920 Minister of Agriculture
 1923–1925 Minister of Agriculture
 1929–1931 Minister of Agriculture
 1926–1928 Minister of Communications
 1931–1932 Minister of Defence
 1932–1933 Minister of Defence

References

1889 births
1942 deaths
People from Valga Parish
People from Kreis Werro
Estonian People's Party politicians
National Centre Party (Estonia) politicians
Defence Ministers of Estonia
Agriculture ministers of Estonia
Government ministers of Estonia
Members of the Riigikogu, 1920–1923
Members of the Riigikogu, 1923–1926
Members of the Riigikogu, 1926–1929
Members of the Riigikogu, 1929–1932
Members of the Riigikogu, 1932–1934
Russian military personnel of World War I
Estonian military personnel of the Estonian War of Independence
Estonian people executed by the Soviet Union